Kate Tremayne is a British novelist from East Tilbury in Essex.

She is best known as the creator of the Loveday series of novels, about a family living in 18th century rural England during the time of the French Revolution. Billed as a Cornish family saga, most of its books contain also sections set in France, London, America and Australia.

While generally categorised as period romance novels, the Loveday books cover a broad spectrum of subjects including betrayal, crime, family rivalry, adventure, sacrifice, class discrimination and domestic abuse.

Kate Tremayne's works include:

Bibliography
The Loveday Series
Adam Loveday (1999)
The Loveday Fortunes (2000)
The Loveday Trials (2001)
The Loveday Scandals (2003)
The Loveday Honour (2004)
The Loveday Pride (2005)
The Loveday Loyalty (2006)
The Loveday Revenge (2007)
The Loveday Secrets (2008)
The Loveday Conspiracy (2009)
The Loveday Vendetta (2010)

References

21st-century British novelists
British historical novelists
Writers from Cornwall
Living people
Year of birth missing (living people)
People from East Tilbury